Karimganj North Assembly constituency is one of the 126 constituencies of the Assam Legislative Assembly.

Karimganj North (constituency number 3) is one of the 5 constituencies located in Karimganj district. Karimganj North is part of Karimganj Lok Sabha constituency along with 7 other assembly segments, namely, Patharkandi, Karimganj South, Ratabari and Badarpur in Karimganj district, Hailakandi, Katlicherra and Algapur in Hailakandi district.

Members of Legislative Assembly 
 1957: Ranendra Mohan Das, Praja Socialist Party
 1962: Rathindra Nath Sen, Independent
 1967: Rathindra Nath Sen, Independent
 1972: Abdul Muqtadir Choudhury, Indian National Congress
 1978: Nishith Ranjan Das, Communist Party of India (Marxist)
 1983: Ketaki Prasad Dutta, Indian National Congress
 1985: Sirajul Hoque Choudhury, Independent
 1991: Mission Ranjan Das, Bharatiya Janata Party
 1996: Sirajul Hoque Choudhury, Asom Gana Parishad
 2000: Mission Ranjan Das, Bharatiya Janata Party
 2001: Mission Ranjan Das, Bharatiya Janata Party
 2006: Mission Ranjan Das, Bharatiya Janata Party
 2011: Kamalakhya Dey Purkayastha, Indian National Congress
 2016: Kamalakhya Dey Purkayastha, Indian National Congress
 2021: Kamalakhya Dey Purkayastha, Indian National Congress

Election results

2016 result

External links

References

Assembly constituencies of Assam